Don Wilks (9 August 1917 – 18 November 1983) was  a former Australian rules footballer who played with Hawthorn in the Victorian Football League (VFL).

Wilks coached Echuca to the 1946 Echuca Football League premiership. 

Wilks coached Auburn to three successive premierships from 1947 to 1949.

He coached North Albury Football Club in 1950 in the Ovens and Murray Football League, losing the grand final to Wangaratta.

In 1951 and 1952, Wilks coached Maryborough in the Ballarat Football League.

Notes

External links 

1917 births
1983 deaths
Australian rules footballers from Victoria (Australia)
Hawthorn Football Club players
Camberwell Football Club players